Gandhi International Airport may refer to either of two international airports in India:
 Indira Gandhi International Airport, serving the National Capital Region of Delhi, located in Palam
 Rajiv Gandhi International Airport, serving the metropolis of Hyderabad, located at Shamshabad